Non-speech audio input is the use of non-speech sounds such as whistling, humming or hissing for entering data or controlling the user interface.

See also 
 Auditory display for non-speech auditory output

References

Sound technology